Sebastian Weigle (born 1961, in East Berlin) is a German conductor and horn player. He is currently Generalmusikdirektor of the Oper Frankfurt and principal conductor of the Yomiuri Nippon Symphony Orchestra.

Biography
Weigle is a nephew of the conductor and music educator Jörg-Peter Weigle and the brother of the late violist Friedemann Weigle of the Artemis Quartet. Weigle studied at the Hochschule für Musik "Hanns Eisler" in horn, piano and conducting. In 1987 he founded the Berlin Chamber Choir, and later he led the New Berlin Chamber Orchestra. He was principal horn player in the orchestra of the Berlin State Opera for 15 years. He also was a member of the jazz orchestra "Vielharmonie"  in East Berlin.

In 1997, he became  of the Staatsoper Unter den Linden. In 2003, Weigle was named "Conductor of the Year" by the German magazine Opernwelt, and subsequently won this award in 2005 and 2006. From 2004 to 2008, he was music director of the Gran Teatre del Liceu in Barcelona.

Weigle conducted a new production of Wagner's Die Meistersinger von Nürnberg at the Bayreuth Festival in 2007, staged by Katharina Wagner, as well as repeated performances in the following years.

Since the 2008–2009 season, Weigle has been Generalmusikdirektor (General Music Director) of the Oper Frankfurt. He conducted new productions of Daphne and Arabella by Richard Strauss, Korngold's Die tote Stadt, Reimann's Lear and Die Fledermaus by Johann Strauß, and he took over Mozart's Die Zauberflöte, Beethovens Fidelio, and Wagner's Tristan und Isolde and Parsifal. He conducted Wagner's Der Ring des Nibelungen, staged by Vera Nemirova, with two complete cycles in 2012. Single performances were recorded.

With Oper Frankfurt, Weigle has made commercial recordings of opera for the OEHMS Classics label.  He is scheduled to stand down as GMD of Oper Frankfurt at the close of the 2022–2023 season.  Outside of Europe, Weigle became principal conductor of the Yomiuri Nippon Symphony Orchestra on 1 April 2019, with an initial contract of three years.

References

External links
 
 
 
 
 Sebastian Weigle (Conductor) bach-cantatas.com 2007
 Michael Lewin agency page on Sebastian Weigle
 Sebastian Weigle Naxos

German horn players
German male conductors (music)
1961 births
Living people
Hochschule für Musik Hanns Eisler Berlin alumni
Musicians from Berlin
20th-century German conductors (music)
21st-century German conductors (music)
20th-century German male musicians
21st-century German male musicians